Several types of Ainu fiddle have been described by anthropologists of the Ainu people of Northern Japan and the adjoining Russian Far East islands of Sakhalin and Kuril.

The missionary-anthropologist John Batchelor noted of the Sakhalin Ainu (1901):

And further of those of Karafuto (1892):

See also
 Ainu music
 Tonkori

References

Fiddle
Bowed instruments